Bradu is a commune in Argeș County, Muntenia, Romania. It is composed of two villages, Bradu and Geamăna.

The commune lies at the northern edge of the Wallachian Plain, on the right bank of the Argeș River. It is located in the central part of the county, just south of the county seat, Pitești.

Natives
Dani Mocanu (born 1992), manele singer

References

Communes in Argeș County
Localities in Muntenia